Aghul or Agul may refer to:

 Aghul people, people of the Caucasus from southern Dagestan and northern Azerbaijan
 Aghul language, their Lezgic language